Final Touches is a full-length album by country music singer Conway Twitty, released in 1993, the year of his death. Allmusic's Dan Cooper called it "a less fitting swan song for Twitty than his duet on “Rainy Night in Georgia” with Sam Moore on the Rhythm, Country and Blues album." The album was Twitty's 58th and final solo album, and 67th overall (counting albums released with Loretta Lynn).

"The Likes of Me" was later recorded by Marty Stuart on his 1995 album The Marty Party Hit Pack.

Track listing
"Two Timin' Two Stepper" (Bobby Byrd, Kostas) - 3:28
"I Hurt for You" (Deborah Allen, Rafe Van Hoy) - 3:53
"Don't It Make You Lonely" (Jackson Leap) - 3:14
"I'm the Only Thing (I'll Hold Against You)" (Joe Diffie, Kim Williams, Lonnie Wilson) - 4:01
"I Don't Love You" (Liz Hengber, Tommy Lee James) - 3:15
"The Likes of Me" (Larry Boone, Rick Bowles) - 3:27
"An Old Memory Like Me" (Don Cook, John Barlow Jarvis) - 3:46
"Final Touches" (Gordon Bradberry, Tony Colton) - 2:45
"You Are to Me" (Billy Livsey, Don Schlitz) - 3:22
"You Ought to Try It Sometime" (Troy Seals, Eddie Setser, Billy Spencer) - 2:59

Production
Produced by Don Cook
Associate producers: Conway Twitty, Dee Henry
Mike Bradley: engineer, mixing
Mark Capps: assistant engineer, mixing assistant
Mastering: Hank Williams (engineer)

Personnel
Conway Twitty – lead vocals
Lonnie Wilson – drums, percussion
Glenn Worf – bass guitar
Bruce Bouton – steel guitar, slide guitar
Mark Casstevens – acoustic guitar
Brent Mason – electric guitar
Dennis Burnside – keyboards, piano, Hammond organ
Rob Hajacos – fiddle
Dennis Wilson – background vocals
Curtis Young – background vocals

Chart performance

1993 albums
Conway Twitty albums
MCA Records albums
Albums produced by Don Cook
Albums published posthumously